Petauke Central is a constituency of the National Assembly of Zambia. It covers Chandema, Kawere Stores, Minga and Petauke in Petauke District of Eastern Province.

List of MPs

References

Constituencies of the National Assembly of Zambia
1964 establishments in Zambia
Constituencies established in 1964